Ron Goodin Power Station is a power station in Alice Springs in the southern part of the Northern Territory of Australia. It was commissioned in 1973 by the Northern Territory government. It is now owned and operated by Territory Generation.

Ron Goodin Power Station is close to Alice Springs and is now close to housing surrounding a golf course. It is intended to be decommissioned when an upgrade to the Owen Springs Power Station is completed in an industrial estate further from residential land.

References

Natural gas-fired power stations in the Northern Territory
Buildings and structures in Alice Springs